Microbial oxidation of sulfur is the oxidation of sulfur by microorganisms to build their structural components. The oxidation of inorganic compounds is the strategy primarily used by chemolithotrophic microorganisms to obtain energy to survive, grow and reproduce. Some inorganic forms of reduced sulfur, mainly sulfide (H2S/HS−) and elemental sulfur (S0), can be oxidized by chemolithotrophic sulfur-oxidizing prokaryotes, usually coupled to the reduction of oxygen (O2) or nitrate (NO3−). Anaerobic sulfur oxidizers include photolithoautotrophs that obtain their energy from sunlight, hydrogen from sulfide, and carbon from carbon dioxide (CO2).

Most of the sulfur oxidizers are autotrophs that can use reduced sulfur species as electron donors for CO2 fixation. The microbial oxidation of sulfur is an important link in the biogeochemical cycling of sulfur in environments hosting both abundant reduced sulfur species and low concentrations of oxygen, such as marine sediments, oxygen minimum zones (OMZs) and hydrothermal systems.

Ecology 
The oxidation of hydrogen sulfide has been considered one of the most important processes in the environment, given that the oceans have had very low oxygen and high sulfidic conditions over most of the Earth's history. The modern analog ecosystems are deep marine basins, for instance in the Black Sea, near the Cariaco trench and the Santa Barbara basin. Other zones of the ocean that experience periodic anoxic and sulfidic conditions are the upwelling zones off the coasts of Chile and Namibia, and hydrothermal vents, which are a key source of H2S to the ocean. Sulfur oxidizing microorganisms (SOM) are thus restricted to upper sediment layers in these environments, where oxygen and nitrateschm are available. The SOM may play an important yet unconsidered role in carbon sequestration, since some models and experiments with Gammaproteobacteria have suggested that sulfur-dependent carbon fixation in marine sediments could be responsible for almost half of total dark carbon fixation in the oceans. Besides, they may have been critical for the evolution of eukaryotic organisms, given that sulfur metabolism could have driven the formation of the symbiotic associations that sustained them (see below).

Although the biological oxidation of reduced sulfur compounds competes with abiotic chemical reactions (e.g. the iron-mediated oxidation of sulfide to iron sulfide (FeS) or pyrite (FeS2)), thermodynamic and kinetic considerations suggest that biological oxidation far exceeds the chemical oxidation of sulfide in most environments.  Experimental data from the anaerobic phototroph Chlorobaculum tepidum indicate that microorganisms enhance sulfide oxidation by three or more orders of magnitude. However, the general contribution of microorganisms to total sulfur oxidation in marine sediments is still unknown. The SOM of Alphaproteobacteria, Gammaproteobacteria and Campylobacterota account for average cell abundances of 108 cells/m3 in organic-rich marine sediments. Considering that these organisms have a very narrow range of habitats, as explained below, a major fraction of sulfur oxidation in many marine sediments may be accounted for by these groups.

Given that the maximal concentrations of oxygen, nitrate and sulfide are usually separated in depth profiles, many SOM cannot directly access their hydrogen or electron sources (reduced sulfur species) and energy sources (O2 or nitrate) at the same time. This limitation has led SOM to develop different morphological adaptations. The large sulfur bacteria (LSB) of the family Beggiatoaceae (Gammaproteobacteria) have been used as model organisms for benthic sulfur oxidation. They are known as 'gradient organisms' that are indicative of hypoxic (low oxygen) and sulfidic (rich in reduced sulfur species) conditions. They internally store large amounts of nitrate and elemental sulfur to overcome the spatial gap between oxygen and sulfide. Some of the Beggiatoaceae are filamentous and can thus glide between oxic/suboxic and sulfidic environments, while the non-motile ones rely on nutrient suspensions, fluxes, or attach themselves to bigger particles. Some marine non-motile LSB are the only known free-living bacteria that have two carbon fixation pathways: the Calvin-Benson cycle (used by plants and other photosynthetic organisms) and the reverse tricarboxylic acid cycle.

Another evolutionary strategy of SOM is to partner up with motile eukaryotic organisms. The symbiotic SOM provides carbon and, in some cases, bioavailable nitrogen to the host, and gets enhanced access to resources and shelter in return. This lifestyle has evolved independently in sediment-dwelling ciliates, oligochaetes, nematodes, flatworms and bivalves.  Recently, a new mechanism for sulfur oxidation was discovered in filamentous bacteria. It is called electrogenic sulfur oxidation (e-SOx), and involves the formation of multicellular bridges that connect the oxidation of sulfide in anoxic sediment layers with the reduction of oxygen or nitrate in oxic surface sediments, generating electric currents over centimeter distances. The so-called cable bacteria are widespread in shallow marine sediments, and are believed to conduct electrons through structures inside a common periplasm of the multicellular filament, a process that may influence the cycling of elements at aquatic sediment surfaces, for instance, by altering iron speciation. The LSB and cable bacteria seem to be restricted to undisturbed sediment with stable hydrodynamic conditions, while symbiotic SOM and their hosts have been mainly found in permeable coastal sediments.

Microbial diversity 
The oxidation of reduced sulfur compounds is performed exclusively by Bacteria and Archaea. All the Archaea involved in this process are aerobic and belong to the Order Sulfolobales, characterized by acidophiles (extremophiles that require low pHs to grow) and thermophiles (extremophiles that require high temperatures to grow). The most studied have been the genera Sulfolobus, an aerobic Archaea, and Acidianus, a facultative anaerobe (i.e. an organism that can obtain energy either by aerobic or anaerobic respiration).

Sulfur oxidizing bacteria (SOB) are aerobic, anaerobic or facultative, and most of them are obligate or facultative autotrophs that can use either carbon dioxide or organic compounds as a source of carbon (mixotrophs). The most abundant and studied SOB are in the family Thiobacilliaceae in terrestrial environments, and in the family Beggiatoaceae in aquatic environments. Aerobic sulfur oxidizing bacteria are mainly mesophilic, growing at moderate ranges of temperature and pH, although some are thermophilic and/or acidophilic. Outside these families, other SOB described belong to the genera Acidithiobacillus, Aquaspirillum, Aquifex, Bacillus, Methylobacterium, Paracoccus, Pseudomonas  Starkeya, Thermithiobacillus, and Xanthobacter. On the other hand, the cable bacteria belong to the family Desulfobulbaceae of the Deltaproteobacteria and are currently represented by two candidate Genera, "Candidatus Electronema" and "Candidatus Electrothrix".

Anaerobic SOB (AnSOB) are mainly neutrophilic/mesophilic photosynthetic autotrophs, obtaining energy from sunlight but using reduced sulfur compounds instead of water as hydrogen or electron donors for photosynthesis. AnSOB include some purple sulfur bacteria (Chromatiaceae) such as Allochromatium, and green sulfur bacteria (Chlorobiaceae), as well as the purple non-sulfur bacteria (Rhodospirillaceae) and some Cyanobacteria. The AnSOB Cyanobacteria are only able to oxidize sulfide to elemental sulfur and have been identified as Oscillatoria, Lyngbya, Aphanotece, Microcoleus, and Phormidium. Some AnSOB, such as the facultative anaerobes Thiobacillus spp., and Thermothrix sp., are chemolithoautotrophs, meaning that they obtain energy from the oxidation of reduced sulfur species, which is then used to fix CO2. Others, such as some filamentous gliding green bacteria (Chloroflexaceae), are mixotrophs. From all of the SOB, the only group that directly oxidize sulfide to sulfate in abundance of oxygen without accumulating elemental sulfur are the Thiobacilli. The other groups accumulate elemental sulfur, which they may oxidize to sulfate when sulfide is limited or depleted.

Biochemistry 
 There are two described pathways for the microbial oxidation of sulfide:

 The sulfide:quinone oxidorreductase pathway (SQR), widespread in green sulfur bacteria, that involves the formation of intermediate compounds such as sulfite (SO32-) and adenosine 5'-phosphosulfate (APS), which are known to have a significant oxygen isotope exchange. The step catalyzed by SQR can also be mediated by a membrane-bound flavocytochrome c-sulfide dehydrogenase (FCSD).
 The Sox pathway, or Kelly-Friedrich pathway as established in the Alphaproteobacteria Paracoccus spp., mediated by the thiosulfate-oxidizing multi-enzyme (TOMES) complex, in which sulfide or elemental sulfur form a complex with the enzyme SoxY and remains bound to it until its final conversion to sulfate.

Similarly, two pathways for the oxidation of sulfite (SO32-) have been identified:

 The rDsr pathway, used by some microorganisms in the Chlorobiota (green sulfur bacteria), Alpha, Beta and Gammaproteobacteria, in which sulfide is oxidized to sulfite by means of a reverse operation of the dissimilatory sulfite reduction (Dsr) pathway. The sulfite generated by rDsr is then oxidized to sulfate by other enzymes.
 The direct oxidation of sulfite to sulfate by a type of mononuclear molybdenum enzyme known as sulfite oxidoreductase. Three different groups of these enzymes are recognized (the xanthine oxidase, sulfite oxidase (SO) and dimethyl sulfoxide reductase families), and they are present in the three domains of life.

On the other hand, at least three pathways exist for the oxidation of thiosulfate (S2O32-) :

The aforementioned Sox pathway, through which both sulfur atoms in thiosulfate are oxidized to sulfate without the formation of any free intermediate.
The oxidation of thiosulfate (S2O32-)  via the formation of tetrathionate (S4O62-) intermediate, that is present in several obligate chemolithotrophic Gamma and Betaproteobacteria as well as in facultative chemolithotrophic Alphaproteobacteria.
The branched thiosulfate oxidation pathway, a mechanism in which water-insoluble globules of intermediate sulfur are formed during the oxidation of thiosulfate and sulfide. It is present in all the anoxygenic photolithotrophic green and purple sulfur bacteria, and the free-living as well as symbiotic strains of certain sulfur-chemolithotrophic bacteria.

In any of these pathways, oxygen is the preferred electron acceptor, but in oxygen-limited environments nitrate, oxidized forms of iron and even organic matter are used instead.

Cyanobacteria normally perform oxygenic photosynthesis using water as electron donor. However, in the presence of sulfide, oxygenic photosynthesis is inhibited, and some cyanobacteria can perform anoxygenic photosynthesis by oxidation of sulfide to thiosulfate − using Photosystem I with sulfite− as a possible intermediate sulfur compound.

Oxidation of sulfide  
Sulfide oxidation can proceed under aerobic or anaerobic conditions. Aerobic sulfide-oxidizing bacteria usually oxidize sulfide to sulfate and are obligate or facultative chemolithoautotrophs. The latter can grow as heterotrophs, obtaining carbon from organic sources, or as autotrophs, using sulfide as the electron donor (energy source) for CO2 fixation. The oxidation of sulfide can proceed aerobically by two different mechanisms: substrate-level phosphorylation, which is dependent on adenosine monophosphate (AMP), and oxidative phosphorylation independent of AMP, which has been detected in several Thiobacilli (T. denitrificans, T. thioparus, T. novellus and T. neapolitanus), as well as in Acidithiobacillus ferrooxidans.  The archaeon Acidianus ambivalens appears to possess both an ADP-dependent and an ADP independent pathway for the oxidation of sulfide. Similarly, both mechanisms operate in the chemoautotroph Thiobacillus denitrificans, which can oxidize sulfide to sulfate anaerobically using nitrate as terminal electron acceptor  which is reduced to dinitrogen (N2). Two other anaerobic strains that can perform a similar process were identified as similar to Thiomicrospira denitrificans and Arcobacter.

Among the heterotrophic SOB are included species of Beggiatoa that can grow mixotrophically, using sulfide to obtain energy (autotrophic metabolism) or to eliminate metabolically formed hydrogen peroxide in the absence of catalase (heterotrophic metabolism). Other organisms, such as the Bacteria Sphaerotilus natans  and the yeast Alternaria  are able to oxidize sulfide to elemental sulfur by means of the rDsr pathway.

Oxidation of elemental sulfur 
Some Bacteria and Archaea can aerobically oxidize elemental sulfur to sulfuric acid. Acidithiobacillus ferrooxidans and Thiobacillus thioparus can oxidize sulfur to sulfite by means of an oxygenase enzyme, although it is thought that an oxidase could be used as well as an energy saving mechanism. For the anaerobic oxidation of elemental sulfur, it is thought that the Sox pathway plays an important role, although this is not yet completely understood. Thiobacillus denitrificans uses oxidized forms on nitrogen as energy source and terminal electron acceptor instead of oxygen.

Oxidation of thiosulfate and tetrathionate 
Most of the chemosynthetic autotrophic bacteria that can oxidize elemental sulfur to sulfate are also able to oxidize thiosulfate to sulfate as a source of reducing power for carbon dioxide assimilation. However, the mechanisms that they utilize may vary, since some of them, such as the photosynthetic purple bacteria, transiently accumulate extracellular elemental sulfur during the oxidation of tetrathionate before oxidizing it to sulfate, while the green sulfur bacteria do not. A direct oxidation reaction (T. versutus ), as well as others that involve sulfite (T. denitrificans) and tetrathionate (A. ferrooxidans, A. thiooxidans and Acidiphilum acidophilum ) as intermediate compounds, have been proposed. Some mixotrophic bacteria only oxidize thiosulfate to tetrathionate.

The mechanism of bacterial oxidation of tetrathionate is still unclear and may involve sulfur disproportionation, during which both sulfide and sulfate are produced from reduced sulfur species, and hydrolysis reactions.

Isotope fractionations 
The fractionation of sulfur and oxygen isotopes during microbial sulfide oxidation (MSO) has been studied to assess its potential as a proxy to differentiate it from the abiotic oxidation of sulfur. The light isotopes of the elements that are most commonly found in organic molecules, such as 12C, 16O, 1H, 14N and 32S, form bonds that are broken slightly more easily than bonds between the corresponding heavy isotopes, 13C, 18O, 2H, 15N and 34S . Because there is a lower energetic cost associated with the use of light isotopes, enzymatic processes usually discriminate against the heavy isotopes, and, as a consequence, biological fractionations of isotopes are expected between the reactants and the products. A normal kinetic isotope effect is that in which the products are depleted in the heavy isotope relative to the reactants (low heavy isotope to light isotope ratio), and although this is not always the case, the study of isotope fractionations between enzymatic processes may allow tracing the source of the product.

Fractionation of oxygen isotopes 
The formation of sulfate in aerobic conditions entails the incorporation of four oxygen atoms from water, and when coupled with dissimilatory nitrate reduction (DNR) -the preferential reduction pathway under anoxic conditions- can have a contribution of oxygen atoms from nitrate as well. The δ18O value of the newly formed sulfate thus depends on the δ18O value of the water, the isotopic fractionation associated with the incorporation of oxygen atoms from water to sulfate and a potential exchange of oxygen atoms between sulfur and nitrogen intermediates and water. MSO has been found to produce small fractionations in 18O compared to water (~5‰). Given the very small fractionation of 18O that usually accompanies MSO, the relatively higher depletions in 18O of the sulfate produced by MSO coupled to DNR (-1.8 to -8.5 ‰)  suggest a kinetic isotope effect in the incorporation of oxygen from water to sulfate and the role of nitrate as a potential alternative source of light oxygen. The fractionations of oxygen produced by sulfur disproportionation from elemental sulfur have been found to be higher, with reported values from 8 to 18.4‰, which suggests a kinetic isotope effect in the pathways involved in oxidation of elemental sulfur to sulfate, although more studies are necessary to determine what are the specific steps and conditions that favor this fractionation. The table below summarizes the reported fractionations of oxygen isotopes from MSO in different organisms and conditions.

Fractionation of sulfur isotopes  
Aerobic MSO generates depletions in the 34S of sulfate that have been found to be as small as −1.5‰ and as large as -18‰. For most microorganisms and oxidation conditions, only small fractionations accompany either the aerobic or anaerobic oxidation of sulfide, elemental sulfur, thiosulfate and sulfite to elemental sulfur or sulfate. The phototrophic oxidation of sulfide to thiosulfate under anoxic conditions also generates negligible fractionations. In the chemolithotrophs Thiobacillus denitrificans and Sulfurimonas denitrificans, MSO coupled to DNR has the effect of inducing the SQR and Sox pathways, respectively. In both cases, a small fractionation in the 34S of the sulfate, lower than -4.3‰, has been measured. Sulfate depletion in 34S from MSO could be used to trace sulfide oxidation processes in the environment, although it does not allow a discrimination between the SQR and Sox pathways.  The depletion produced by MSO coupled to DNR is similar to up to -5‰ depletion estimated for the 34S in the sulfide produced from rDsr.  In contrast, disproportionation under anaerobic conditions generates sulfate enriched in 34S up to 9‰ and ~34‰ from sulfide and elemental sulfur, respectively. Just like the fractionation of oxygen isotopes, the larger fractionations in sulfate from the disproportionation of elemental sulfur point to a key step or pathway critical for inducing this large kinetic isotope effect. The table below summarizes the reported fractionations of sulfur isotopes from MSO in different organisms and conditions.

See also 

 Isotope fractionation
 Microbial metabolism
 Sulfur metabolism
 Sulfate-reducing microorganisms
 Dissimilatory sulfate reduction
 Dissimilatory nitrate reduction

References 

Sulfur metabolism
Trophic ecology
Bacterial substances